Studs Lonigan is a novel trilogy by American author James T. Farrell: Young Lonigan (1932), The Young Manhood of Studs Lonigan (1934), and Judgment Day (1935). In 1998, the Modern Library ranked the Studs Lonigan trilogy 29th on its list of the 100 best English-language novels of the 20th century.

The trilogy was adapted into a minor 1960 film and a 1979 television miniseries, both of which were simply titled Studs Lonigan.

Themes
Farrell wrote these three novels at a time of national despair. During the Great Depression, many of America's most gifted writers and artists aspired to create a single, powerful work of art that would fully expose the evils of capitalism and lead to a political and economic overhaul of the American system.

Farrell chose to use his own personal knowledge of Irish-American life on the South Side of Chicago to create a portrait of an average American slowly destroyed by the "spiritual poverty" of his environment. Both Chicago and the Catholic Church of that era are described at length and faulted. Farrell describes Studs sympathetically as Studs slowly deteriorates, changing from a tough but fundamentally good-hearted, adventurous teenage boy to an embittered, physically shattered alcoholic.

Film
Parts of Farrell's novels were made into a B movie in 1960, directed by Irving Lerner and starring Christopher Knight in the title role. Other cast members included Frank Gorshin, Venetia Stevenson, and Jack Nicholson (in one of his first movie roles). The film was not widely reviewed. Pauline Kael wrote in The New Yorker that "it’s an honorable low-budget effort by a group of people trying to break the Hollywood molds, and there are a few passages of daring editing that indicate what the film was aiming for. It’s an underfinanced American attempt at I Vitelloni.

Television

In 1979 Studs Lonigan was produced as a television miniseries starring Harry Hamlin, Colleen Dewhurst, Brad Dourif, Dan Shor, and Charles Durning. Production Designer Jan Scott won an Emmy Award for Outstanding Art Direction for a Limited Series or a Special. Reginald Rose wrote the adaptation of the trilogy. The miniseries preserves the novel's tragic ending but humanizes Studs Lonigan's family and friends to a very considerable degree.

Other
The entire miniseries is housed at the University of Georgia's Peabody Collection. The University has made the series available online by using the keyword "Studs Lonigan" in the search box.

Reception and legacy

According to William McCann:
No writer has described a specific area of American society so thoroughly and comprehensively as Farrell did in the seven novels of Studs Lonigan and Danny O'Neill (1932-43).  A consummate realist in viewpoint and method, he turned repeatedly in his fiction to the subject he knew best, the Irish Catholic neighborhood of Chicago's South Side. Drawing on lacerating personal experience, Farrell wrote about people who were victims of injurious social circumstances and of their own spiritual and intellectual shortcomings. He depicted human frustration, ignorance, cruelty, violence, and moral degeneration with sober, relentless veracity....Despite his Marxist leanings, Farrell's fiction is not that of a reformer, or a doctrinaire theorist, but rather the patient humorless representation of ways of life and states of mind he abhors….Farrell’s place in American letters, however, as certainly the most industrious and probably the most powerful writer in the naturalistic tradition stemming from Frank Norris and Dreiser, was solidly established with the Lonegan--O'Neil series.

References

Further reading
 Branch, Edgar M. "Studs Lonigan: Symbolism and Theme." College English 23.3 (1961): 191-196 online.
 Douglas, Ann. "Studs Lonigan and the Failure of History in Mass Society: A Study in Claustrophobia." American Quarterly 29.5 (1977): 487-505 online.
 Fanning, Charles, and Ellen Skerrett. "James T. Farrell and Washington Park: The Novel as Social History." Chicago History 8 (1979): 80-91.
 Onkey, Lauren. "James Farrell's Studs Lonigan Trilogy and the Anxieties of Race." Éire-Ireland 40.2 (2005): 104-118. excerpt
 Rosenthal, T. G. "Studs Lonigan and the Search for an American Tragedy." Bulletin. British Association for American Studies 7 (1963): 46-54 online.
 Shiffman, Daniel. "Ethnic Competitors in Studs Lonigan." Melus 24.3 (1999): 67-79.
 Weathers, Glenda B. "The Territorial Imperative in 'Studs Lonigan'." South Atlantic Review 51.1 (1986): 101-113 online.

External links

American novel series
1960 films
Films directed by Irving Lerner
Novels set in Chicago
American novels adapted into films
1970s American television series
Films scored by Jerry Goldsmith
United Artists films